The Abkhaz alphabet is a Cyrillic alphabet used for the Abkhaz language.

Abkhaz did not become a written language until the 19th century. Up until then, Abkhazians, especially princes, had been using Greek (up to c. 9th century), Georgian (9–19th centuries), and partially Turkish (18th century) languages. The Abkhaz word for alphabet is анбан (anban), which was borrowed from Georgian ანბანი (anbani).

History
The first Abkhaz alphabet was created in 1862 by Peter von Uslar. It had 55 letters and was based on the Cyrillic script. Another version, having 51 letters, was used in 1892 by Dimitry Gulia and K. Machavariani. In 1909, the alphabet was again expanded to expanded to 55 letters by Andria Tchotchua to adjust to the extensive consonantal inventory of Abkhaz.

In 1926, during the korenizatsiya policy in the Soviet Union, the Cyrillic alphabet was replaced by a Latin alphabet devised by Nikolay Marr. It featured 76 letters and was called the "Abkhaz analytical alphabet". In 1928, this was replaced by another Latin alphabet. (See illustration at right.) From 1938 to 1954 the Abkhaz language was written in Georgian Mkhedruli script.

Since 1954, the Abkhaz language has been written in a new 62-letter Cyrillic alphabet (see chart below). In 1996, the most recent reform of the alphabet was implemented: while labialization had hitherto been marked with two additional letters, ә and у, since then only ә was retained in this function. Unusually, the Cyrillic plosive letters К П Т represent ejective consonants; the non-ejectives (pulmonic consonants) are derived from these by means of a descender at the bottom of the letter. In the case of the affricates, however, the plain letters are pulmonic, and the derived letters ejective.

The modern Abkhaz orthography gives preference to the letters Г К П Т with descender (Ӷ Қ Ԥ Ҭ) instead of middle hook (Ҕ Ӄ Ҧ Ꚋ). The characters Ԥ and ԥ have been encoded in Unicode since version 5.2.

The characters ь and ә are used as part of digraphs and are not included in the alphabet.

See also 
 Dzze
 Zhwe
 Cche
 Shwe (Cyrillic)

References

External links 
PT Sans and PT Serif fonts
Deja Vu fonts
 Теимураз Гванцеладзе: «Из истории перехода абхазского книжного языка на грузинскую графику»

Cyrillic alphabets
Alphabet